School District No. 20 (Kootenay-Columbia) is a school district in southeastern British Columbia. It includes Trail, Castlegar, Rossland, Warfield, and Fruitvale.

History
The Kootenay-Columbia School district was created in 1996 with the amalgamation of School District 9 (Castlegar) and School District 11 (Trail).

Schools
Information in this table changes regularly but the listed values aren't always accurate. Listed values are current as of December 8th, 2018.

See also
List of school districts in British Columbia

References

External links
 Official site

West Kootenay
20